Bagudo is a Local Government Area in Kebbi State, Nigeria, sharing a boundary with the Republic of Niger and Republic of Benin. Its headquarters are in the town of Bagudo.

It has an area of 7,782 km and a population of 865,817 at the 2006 census.

The postal code of the area is 871.

Bagudo was strongly cosmopolitan with settled populations of Fulani, Zabarmawa and remains so with the Hausa language spoken as a lingua-franca by over 1.5 million speakers in the region. Islam arrived the city in the 16 century or earlier primarily through the trans-Saharan trade and as a result became wealthy and the commercial nerve centre of the region and is still associated as the "centre of Farming, Herdmen and Many more.

References

Local Government Areas in Kebbi State